Crawford High School is a 2A high school located in Crawford, Texas (USA). It is part of the Crawford Independent School District located in northwestern McLennan County.   In 2011, the school was rated "Recognized" by the Texas Education Agency. U.S. president George W. Bush and Russian president Vladimir Putin visited the school in November 2001, shortly before visiting nearby Prairie Chapel Ranch.

Athletics

The Crawford Pirates compete in the following sports - 

Cross Country, Football, Volleyball, Basketball, Powerlifting, Golf, Track, Tennis, Softball, and Baseball

Team State Titles
Football - 
2004 (2A/Division II)
Girls Basketball - 
1975 (B)
Girls Cross Country - 
1998 (2A), 1999 (2A)
Softball - 
2012 (2A), 2014 (2A), 2019 (2A), 2022 (2A)
Volleyball - 
2017 (2A), 2019 (2A)

Individual State Champions
Seth Kolscheen, 2019 Boys Class 2A Powerlifting Heavyweight Division
Seth Kolscheen, 2018 Boys Class 2A Powerlifting Heavyweight Division
Ann-Marie Dunlap, 2014 Girls Class 2A 3200 Meter Run 
Ann-Marie Dunlap, 2014 Girls Class 2A 1600 Meter Run 
Ann-Marie Dunlap, 2013 Girls Class 2A Cross Country 
Set State Record 
Ann-Marie Dunlap, 2012 Girls Class 2A Cross Country 
Jake Blenden, 2012 Boys Class 2A Golf

References

External links
Crawford ISD

Schools in McLennan County, Texas
Public high schools in Texas